De'von Maurice Hall (born September 5, 1987) is a former American football safety. He was signed by the Minnesota Vikings as an undrafted free agent in 2009. He played college football at Utah State.

Hall has also played for the Indianapolis Colts and Tampa Bay Buccaneers.

Hall was held in a Los Angeles County jail on a charge of murder suspected in the beating killing of his mother in July 2017. He was found not guilty by reason of insanity in February 2020, and was sent to a hospital for treatment.

References

External links
Indianapolis Colts bio
Minnesota Vikings bio 
Utah State Aggies bio 

1987 births
Living people
Players of American football from Los Angeles
People from Reseda, Los Angeles
American football wide receivers
American football linebackers
American football safeties
Utah State Aggies football players
Minnesota Vikings players
Indianapolis Colts players
Tampa Bay Buccaneers players